Kala Keerthi Carl Muller (22 October 1935 – 2 December 2019) was an award-winning Sri Lankan writer, poet and journalist best known for his trilogy about Burghers in Sri Lanka: The Jam Fruit Tree, Yakada Yaka and Once Upon A Tender Time. He won Gratiaen Awards for The Jam Fruit Tree in 1993 and a State Literary Award for his historical novel, Children of the Lion. He was the first Sri Lankan author to publish a book internationally. He was reported to have died on 2 December 2019 which was confirmed by his son Jeremy Muller.

Biography 
Muller was born in Kandy, the eldest in a family of thirteen. Dismissed from three schools, Muller was finally educated at prestigious Royal College, Colombo. He started his first job as a weighbridge clerk at the Mosajee's Wystevyke Mill in Colombo, thereafter he joined the Royal Ceylon Navy and served as a signalman for four years. He then spent four months in the Ceylon Signal Corps, before being discharged as unfit for duty. He then joined the Colombo Port Commission as a signalman in the pilot station. Two years later he joined a new advertising agency established by Tim Horshington. This started his writing career working in advertising, travel and entertainment, before moving into journalism in Ceylon, Dubai and Bahrain. He served as  vice-president for international sales at the Export Centre in Sharjah in 1970s with Fred Pettera and later joined Expo Centre Sharjah as part of the management team led by Fasahat Ali Khan under the ownership of Sharjah Chamber of Commerce and industry in 1992. He worked for the Times of Oman during the Gulf war before returning to Sri Lanka due to ill health. He went on to briefly serve in the Ceylon Army and later joined the (?)  as a signals officer. He married Sortain Harris. He also worked for Gulf News and Khaleej Times in Dubai, United Arab Emirates.

Muller retired from his lifelong work as the onset of dementia and other medical ailments took a toll on his health. He died on the 2nd of December 2019 at the age of 84 in Kandy with his three children and his grandson at his side.

Bibliography

Novels 
 The Jam Fruit Tree (Winner of the Gratiaen Prize) (1993)
 Yakada Yaka (1994)
 Once Upon A Tender Time (1995)
 Spit and Polish
 Maudiegirl and the von Bloss Kitchen

Historical fiction 
 Colombo – A Novel (1996)
 Children of the Lion (1997) (Winner of the State Literary Award)
 City of the Lion

Science fiction 
 Exodus 2300 (2003)

Essays 
 Firing at Random

Short stories 
 A Funny Thing Happened on the Way to the Cemetery
 Birdsong & Other Tales
 All God's Children (2004) (shortlisted for the Gratiaen Award)
 The Python of Pura Malai and Other Stories
 Wedding Night (2007)

Poetry 
 Father Samaan and the Devil
 Sri Lanka – A Lyric
 Propitiations
 A Bedlam of Persuasions
 Clouds over my Senses
 Read Me in Silence
 The Thin Red Line
 Our Star ship and its Sorry Crew

Children's fiction 
 Ranjit Discovers Where Kandy Began (1992) (also rendered in Sinhala)
 The Python of Pura Malai and other stories

Academic works 
 The Elizabethans: The Origin of, and the Great Flowering of Modern English Literature – Volume I

Views and reviews 
 Many Bulls in My China Shop
 More Bulls in My China Shop
 More and More Bulls in My China Shop
 The Bulls are Back in My China Shop

Monographs 
 Glorying in that Great Divide
 Conflict in Cinderella's Kitchen
 The Service Economy: Is there a Dangerous Dichotomisation of Wealth?
 Productivity: The Key to Economic Domination
 Tourism: Aiming for that Magic Million
 God Men Rising: Challenging the Bedrock of Hindu Beliefs and Values
 Conflict Within: Challenging Sovereignty and Human Solidarity

Aphorism 
 Carl Muller's Mental Mayhems

Hobbies 
 Stamp Stories of the USA

Travelogues 
 Indian Journeys

Works edited 
 Mews and Purrs (Lancashire, England)]
 The Tide Press of a Dedicated Life: A Tribute to Christine Spittel-Wilson
 Rendering Unto Caesar
 The Poems of Destry Muller (Winner of the State Literary Award)
 A Rainbow Sash Adorns my Dreaming Sky

References

External links 
Partial Profile at The Literary Encyclopaedia
Author page at Penguin Books India
Author page on Goodreads
Author page on WriteClique

1935 births
2019 deaths
Alumni of Royal College, Colombo
Burgher journalists
Burgher military personnel
Burgher poets
Burgher writers
People from Kandy
People from British Ceylon
Sri Lankan novelists
Sri Lanka Signals Corps soldiers
Sri Lanka Navy sailors
Kala Keerthi
Sri Lankan children's writers
Writers about India